Aperture value may refer to:

  in the APEX system (Additive System of Photographic Exposure)
 Aperture value mode (Av mode), an aperture priority mode on electronically controlled cameras
 Aperture
 F-number